These are the most popular given names in the United States for all years of the 1950s.

1950 

Males
John
James
Robert
William
Michael
David
Richard
Thomas
Charles
Gary
Females
Linda
Mary
Patricia
Barbara
Susan
Maria
Sandra
Nancy
Deborah
Kathleen

1951 

Males
Robert 
James
John
Michael
David
William
Richard
Thomas
Charles
Gary
Females
Linda
Mary
Patricia
Barbara
Deborah
Susan
Nancy
Maria
Kathleen
Karen; Sandra (tie)

1952 

Males
James
Robert
John
Michael
David
William
Richard
Thomas
Charles
Gary
Females
Linda
Mary
Patricia
Deborah
Barbara
Susan
Maria
Nancy
Debra
Kathleen

1953 

Males
Michael
Robert
James
John
David
William
Richard
Thomas
Gary
Charles
Females
Mary
Linda
Deborah
Patricia
Susan
Barbara
Debra
Maria
Nancy
Karen

1954 

Males
Robert
Michael
John
James
David
William
Richard
Thomas
Mark
Gary
Females
Mary
Deborah
Linda
Debra
Patricia; Susan (tie)
Barbara
Maria
Karen
Nancy
----

1955 

Males
Michael
James
David; Robert (tie)
John
William
Richard
Mark
Thomas
Charles; Steven (tie)
----
Females
Mary
Deborah
Debra; Linda (tie)
Patricia
Susan
Maria
Barbara
Karen
Nancy
----

1956 

Males
Michael
Robert
David
James
John
William
Richard
Mark
Thomas
Steven
Females
Mary
Susan
Debra
Linda
Deborah
Patricia
Karen
Maria
Barbara
Donna

1957 

Males
Michael
James
Robert
David
John
William
Richard
Mark
Thomas
Steven
Females
Mary
Susan
Linda
Karen
Patricia
Deborah; Debra (tie)
Maria
Nancy
----

1958 

Males
Michael
David
Robert
John
James
William
Mark
Richard
Thomas
Charles
Females
Mary
Linda
Susan
Patricia
Karen
Maria
Debra
Cynthia
Deborah
Barbara

1959 

Males
Michael
David
James
John
Robert
Mark
William
Richard
Thomas
Steven
Females
Mary
Susan
Linda
Donna; Patricia (tie)
Maria 
Karen
Debra
Cynthia
Deborah
----

References 
 Most Popular 1000 Names of the 1950s from the Social Security Administration

1950s
1950s in the United States